

National team

National student team
6th World University Futsal Championship 1998 in Braga, Portugal

Intercontinental Futsal Cup

Futsal European Clubs Championship

Top League

7th Russian futsal championship 1998/1999

Promotion tournament

National Cup

Final Four

First League. Division A

First League. Division B

Women's League
7th Russian women futsal championship 1998/1999

Women's National Cup

References

Russia
Seasons in Russian futsal
futsal
futsal